Ida Brander (1857–1931), was a Finnish-Swedish stage actress.

Ida Brander was trained at the Royal Swedish Opera. She was engaged at the Swedish Theatre in Helsinki in 1877-1916, where she became one of the leading attractions of the theatre and had a long successful career, "where she was finally given the opportunity to display her shining talent. Again and again, she performed numerous roles with glowing success with the audience and unanimous acknowledgement from the critics."

References

Further reading
 

1857 births
1931 deaths
Finnish stage actresses
Finnish silent film actresses
Swedish people of Finnish descent
Swedish stage actresses
Swedish silent film actresses
20th-century Swedish actresses
Actresses from Stockholm
19th-century Finnish actresses
20th-century Swedish women